The La Coruna International or La Coruña Internacional was a men's and women's international tennis tournament founded in 1966  as the La Coruna Tournament or Torneo de La Coruña at the La Coruña Tennis Club, La Coruña, Galicia, Spain. It was played on outdoor clay courts until 1973.

History
The Torneo de La Coruña was a men's and women's international tennis tournament founded in 1966. and was  played on outdoor clay courts at the La Coruña Tennis Club, La Coruña, Galacia, Spain. The tournament was only held until 1973.

Finals

Men's Singles
(incomplete roll)

Men's Doubles
(incomplete roll)

Women's Singles
(incomplete roll)

Women's Doubles
(incomplete roll)

References

Clay court tennis tournaments
Defunct tennis tournaments in Spain